Great Eastern Conventions, Inc. was an entertainment company which produced comic book conventions, most actively during the years 1987-1996. In New York City, the Great Eastern shows filled the gap between the mid-1980s demise of the annual Comic Art Convention and Creation Conventions, and the establishment of promoter Michael Carbonaro's annual Big Apple Comic Con in 1996. From 1993–1995, Great Eastern hosted two New York City shows annually at the Jacob K. Javits Convention Center. In addition to running shows in the Northeastern United States, Great Eastern also ran shows in Georgia, Florida, California, Oregon, Minnesota, and Texas.

Great Eastern was founded in 1977 by New Jersey-based promoter Frederic Greenberg.

History 
Greenberg, a comic book fan himself, began hosting conventions in 1977 after he discovered that there weren't regular shows in his area.

From 1983–1987, Great Eastern hosted monthly conventions in Mount Laurel, New Jersey, routinely drawing between 150 and 175 people. Originally based in Boonton, New Jersey, by 1989 the company had moved its offices to Ringoes, New Jersey.

By 1990, Great Eastern was running one-day shows weekly throughout the Northeastern United States, as well as larger shows in cities likes San Francisco, Tampa, and Atlanta. Their June 1990 convention at the New York Penta Hotel was billed as "the biggest show of the year." Great Eastern hosted comic book conventions in South Florida from 1990-1994. Venues included the Howard Johnson Hotel—North Miami Beach, the Marriott Hotel—Coral Gables, and the Marriott Hotel—Hialeah Gardens. Featured guests varied based on availability, such as Stan Lee, Todd McFarlane, George Pérez, Rob Liefeld, Jim Starlin, John Beatty, Pat Broderick, Martin Nodell, Joe Staton, Mike Zeck, Dick Giordano. Great Eastern pulled out of South Florida after 1994 as a result of after-effects from Hurricane Andrew's impact in August 1992.

In 1992, Great Eastern Conventions partnered with Cerebus creator Dave Sim in promoting small conventions in over 20 U.S. locations, including Indiana, Oregon, Texas, as well as in South Florida.

From 1993–1995, Great Eastern hosted two large-scale conventions annually at the Jacob K. Javits Convention Center, which were dubbed "The New York Comic Book Spectacular." The February 1994 show was affected by a large winter storm which forced about one-fifth of the special guests to cancel their appearances. Great Eastern mounted a "Philadelphia Comic Book Spectacular" in October 1994; Greenberg was soon sued by David Greenhill, promoter of Philadelphia's Comicfest '93, for scheduling the Philadelphia Comic Book Spectacular the same weekend as Greenhill's planned Comicfest '94.

Despite their large fan attendance and expansive venues, Great Eastern's large shows were criticized by many within the industry for pandering to dealers and spectacle. As frequent participant Evan Dorkin stated, "The New York shows are extremely unfriendly to both creators and fans. . . . There is limited programming, limited professional appearances at these shows."

In March 1996, Greenberg, at a very late point, cancelled what had been advertised as a larger-than-usual Great Eastern show, scheduled to be held at the New York Coliseum on 59th St. & Columbus Circle. As a substitute event, comic book retailer Michael Carbonaro and others on the spur of the moment mounted the first Big Apple Comic Con. Greenberg and Great Eastern Conventions disappeared from the fan convention circuit from that moment forward.

Publications 
Greenberg also published two magazines which covered the comics industry, Comic Book Week (est. 1993) and Comic Talk. In mid-1993 he had to cut down the frequency of both publications due to the slowdown in the industry.

Dates and locations

References 

Entertainment companies of the United States
Companies based in Hunterdon County, New Jersey
1977 establishments in New Jersey
Defunct comics conventions
Entertainment companies established in 1977
Conventions in New Jersey